The Hōei eruption of Mount Fuji started on December 16, 1707 (during the Hōei era, 23rd day of the 11th month of the 4th year) and ended on February 24, 1708.  It was the last confirmed eruption of Mount Fuji, with three unconfirmed eruptions reported from 1708 to 1854. It is well known for the immense ash-fall it produced over eastern Japan, and subsequent landslides and starvation across the country. Hokusai's One Hundred Views of Mount Fuji includes an image of the small crater at a secondary eruption site on the southwestern slope. The area where the eruption occurred is called Mount Hōei because it occurred in the fourth year of the Hōei era. Today, the crater of the main eruption can be visited from the Fujinomiya or Gotemba Trails on Mount Fuji.

Extent of eruption

Three years before the eruption, rumbling began in 1704 from February 4 to February 7. One to two months prior to the eruption, earthquakes could be felt around the base of the volcano with magnitudes reaching as high as 5. Due to the short time between the earthquake and eruption, these events have been linked together. The event was characterized as a plinian eruption, with pumice, scoria, and ash shot into the stratosphere and raining down far east of the volcano. It has been classified as an explosive eruption. Landslides soon followed the eruption due to heavy rainfall and flooding in the area. It is suggested that two types of magma, silicic and basaltic magma, mixed together as a result of the earthquake.

The eruption happened on Mount Fuji's east–northeast flank and formed three new volcanic vents, named No. 1, No. 2, and No. 3 Hōei vents. The catastrophe developed over several days; an initial earthquake with an explosion of cinders and ash were followed some days later with more forceful ejections of rocks and stones. The Hōei eruption is said to have caused the worst ash-fall disaster in Japanese history.

Cinders and ash fell like rain in Izu, Kai, Sagami, and Musashi provinces, and ash-fall was recorded in Tokyo and Yokohama to the east of the volcano. In Edo, the volcanic ash was several centimeters thick. The released ash from the eruption fell to the earth and covered many crops in the area, stunting growth. There is no estimate for the number of deaths caused by the eruption. The eruption is rated a 5 on the Volcanic Explosivity Index.

Effect on local population 
The Hōei eruption, from 1707–1708, had a disastrous effect on the people living in the Fuji region. The tephra released from the volcano caused an agricultural decline, leading many in the Fuji area to die of starvation.

Volcanic ash fell and widely covered the cultivated fields east of Mount Fuji. To recover the fields, farmers cast volcanic products out to dumping grounds making piles. The rain washed material from the dumping grounds into the rivers and made some of the rivers shallower, especially the Sakawa River, into which huge volumes of ash fell, resulting in temporary dams. Heavy rainfall on 7–8 August 1708, the year following the Hōei eruption, caused an avalanche of volcanic ash and mud, breaking the dams and flooding the Ashigara plain.

Many of the casualties caused by the Hōei eruption were due to flooding, landslides, and famine following the event. The crops began to fail when the released ash descended upon the fields, leading to widespread starvation in the Edo (renamed Tokyo in 1869) area. Due to debris that included large rocks, floodwater, and ash, people could not move easily to other places, which led to further casualties from hunger in the Edo area.

Cause of the Hōei Eruption 
It is hypothesized that the Hōei eruption was due to two earthquakes, namely Genroku and Hōei, with a magnitude of 8.2 and 8.7. The former took place in 1703 at the Sagami Trough while the latter occurred in 1707 at the Nankai Trough. The Hōei eruption happened forty-nine days after the Hōei earthquake. The Genroku quake was the largest to happen at the Sagami Trough, however, it wasn't enough to start the eruption, although it did contribute to the eruption. The main earthquake that triggered it was the Hōei quake which caused stress and compression of the magma chambers underneath Mount Fuji.

A dike system stretches from the surface of Mount Fuji to 20 km into the subsurface. At 8 km depth, there are magma chambers of a dacitic and andesitic nature while at the deepest portion of the dike, a basaltic melt is located. The dike acts as a conduit for the magma chambers to reach the surface. The Genroku event caused a change in the normal stress acting on the dike system which had the effect of clasping the dike as well as the melts. The magma chambers were compressed and the conduit (dike) itself was buckled, trapping the melts. The chambers were under great pressure, but it wasn't enough to force the magma through the surface. This changed with the arrival of the Hōei earthquake.

The Hōei event similarly affected the dike system as the Genruko quake in the sense that there were normal stress changes and buckling of the dike but the resemblance ends there. The normal stress was increased in the upper segment (8 km in depth) of the dike, clasping it. This forced the dacitic and andesitic magmas to remain in place. However, the Southeastern portion of the dyke which remained clamped by the Genruko quake was unbuckled due to the reduced normal stress in that area by the Hōei earthquake. This allowed for the basaltic melt, which was still being compressed, to rise and mix with the trapped dacitic and andesitic melts. This caused magma expansion due to the "vesiculation" of the now-mixed magma, allowing it to travel to the surface of Mount Fuji. It seems that the dilatation of the magma reservoir can cause gas bubbles to rise with the melt allowing more depressurization to occur. Thus, producing the Hōei eruption. However, one must keep in mind that there could be other important processes that played a part in bringing about the eruption. Indeed, the Hōei eruption occurred 49 days after the earthquake. This suggests that other procedures, such as the melt ''mixing through sloshing'', could have taken place.

Tectonic setting and the threat of more eruptions 

Japan is located in the most geologically active region of Earth, called The Ring of Fire. This region is known for its many volcanic eruptions and earthquakes. The location of Mount Fuji puts it in the middle of three colliding tectonic plates, the Eurasian, North American, and Philippine Sea plate, resulting in the history of high geologic activity. The Hōei eruption was preceded by a magnitude 8.6 earthquake, just 49 days before the eruption. Many volcanologists believe that this earthquake was likely the cause of the eruption.

Based on the internal pressure inside the volcano that scientists measured in 2012, speculation of a possible eruption is high. There have been many earthquakes since the 1707 Hōei earthquake, with some minor activity in the 1980s, in the year 2000 and 2001, and the major Tohoku earthquake in 2011. After the activity observed in 2000, magma has been found to be collecting under the volcano. Damage is estimated to cost Japan over US$25 billion if another eruption were to occur. It is assumed that, much like the 1707 Hōei eruption, the volcano would almost certainly erupt at the same vent where the previous eruption occurred. A repeat of the 1707 Hōei eruption is also said to impact over 30 million people in the highly populated areas of eastern Tokyo, Kanagawa, Chiba and parts of Yamanashi, Saitama, and Shizuoka. The volcano would most heavily affect Tokyo, and would likely cause power outages, water shortages, and malfunctions in the highly technical city. Mount Fuji has more than 20 seismic activity stations monitoring any movement in the ground. It is impossible to determine when the next eruption will occur, but it will most likely erupt soon due to the long dormancy time.

See also
 1707 Hōei earthquake
 Historic eruptions of Mount Fuji
 Mount Hōei

References

External links 
 富士山火山防災協議会 (Council for Fuji volcano disaster reduction)
 富士山宝永噴火（1707）後の土砂災害(PDF) (Distribution of sediment disasters after the 1707 Hoei eruption of Fuji Volcano in central Japan, based on historical documents)

1707 in Japan
1707 natural disasters
18th-century volcanic events
Mount Fuji
Plinian eruptions
Hōei eruption
Volcanic eruptions in Japan
Landslides in Japan